Title 38 of the United States Code outlines the role of Veterans' Benefits in the United States Code.

 Part I: General Provisions
 Part II: General Benefits
 Part III: Readjustment and Related Benefits
 Part IV: General Administrative Provisions
 Part V: Boards, Administrations, and Services
 Part VI: Acquisition And Disposition of Property

External links
U.S. Code Title 38, via United States Government Printing Office
U.S. Code Title 38, via Cornell University

38
Title 38